Afrojavanica melaenoides is a moth in the  family Erebidae. It was described by Rothschild in 1935. It is found on Java.

References

Natural History Museum Lepidoptera generic names catalog

Moths described in 1935
Spilosomina
Moths of Indonesia